Heavy baryon chiral perturbation theory (HBChPT) is an effective quantum field theory used to describe the interactions of pions and nucleons/baryons. It is somewhat an extension of chiral perturbation theory (ChPT) which just describes the low-energy interactions of pions. In a richer theory one would also like to describe the interactions of baryons with pions. A fully relativistic Lagrangian of nucleons is non-predictive as the quantum corrections, or loop diagrams can count as  quantities and therefore do not describe higher-order corrections.

Because the baryons are much heavier than the pions, HBChPT rests on the use of a nonrelativistic description of baryons compared to that of the pions. Therefore, higher order terms in the HBChPT Lagrangian come in at higher orders of  where  is the baryon mass.

Quantum chromodynamics